Howie 61 is an album by Wayne Krantz released in 2012. It employs a large group of musicians and combines aspects of modern jazz harmony and rhythmic vocabulary with a compact, rock-like approach to structure.

Track listing
All songs written by Wayne Krantz, except where noted. 

 "Howie 61"  – 2:50
 "The Bad Guys" – 2:32
 "Check Yo Self" – 7:35 (Duke Bootee / O. Jackson / Grandmaster Melle Mel / Bobby Robinson)
 "I'm Afraid That I'm Dead" – 2:58
 "Son of a Scientist"  – 4:32
 "Can't Stand To Rock" – 3:38
 "I'd Like to Thank My Body" – 2:32
 "U Strip It" – 3:54
 "BelLs" – 2:26
 "How the West Was Left" – 6:07

Personnel
 Wayne Krantz – electric guitar (1–3, 5–10), vocals (1, 2, 4–8, 10), piano (4), ring modulator (9)
 John Beasley – piano (2, 5, 6, 8, 10)
 Henry Hey – piano (1)
 David Binney – saxophone (8)
 Paul Stacey – slide guitar (10)
 John Patitucci – double bass (2, 8)
 Owen Biddle – bass guitar (1)
 James Genus – bass guitar (3)
 Pino Palladino – bass guitar (10)
 Tal Wilkenfeld – bass guitar (5, 6)
 Keith Carlock – drums (3)
 Vinnie Colaiuta – drums (5, 6)
 Charley Drayton – drums (2, 8)
 Anton Fig – drums (9)
 Jeremy Stacey – drums (10)
 Kenny Wollesen – drums (7)
 Nate Wood – drums (1)
 Yasushi Miura – sonics (4)
 Gabriela Anders – vocals (5, 7, 10)

References

2012 albums
Wayne Krantz albums
Abstract Logix albums